Counterparty is a peer-to-peer financial platform and distributed, open source Internet protocol built on top of the Bitcoin blockchain and network. It was one of the most well-known "Bitcoin 2.0" (later known as non-fungible token) platforms in 2014, along with Mastercoin, Ethereum, Colored Coins, Ripple and BitShares. 

It is a "metacoin"-type protocol. It provides such features as tradable user-created currencies, additional financial instruments and a decentralized asset exchange. 

Over time, it has developed a strong user-base, mostly due to the protocol hosting the non-fungible token collections Spells Of Genesis (2015) and Rare Pepe (2016).

History 
In November 2014, Counterparty added support for the Ethereum Virtual Machine (EVM) to the Counterparty protocol and allowing all Ethereum decentralized applications to be run on the Bitcoin blockchain within the Counterparty protocol.

In 2014, Counterparty was part of a plan by Overstock.com to issue and trade legal securities on a blockchain. The initiative, originally named "Medici", eventually became Overstock's tZERO.

In August 2014, Dogeparty, which is based on Dogecoin, was forked off Counterparty, offering lower fees and faster transaction times.

In March 2015, a company called EverdreamSoft released the blockchain trading card, FDCARD, on the Counterparty platform that was later usable in their blockchain game Spells Of Genesis.

Technology

XCP Currency 
Counterparty has a native currency, XCP, which was created during January 2014 by 'proof of burn', a unique alternative to a crowdsale or ICO, designed to maximize the project's legitimacy by eliminating any possible source of unfairness in the launch. 

To create XCP in the network, 2140 BTC, worth between US $1.6 million and US $2 million at the time, were destroyed by sending them to a provably un-spendable Bitcoin address. XCP is used in the Counterparty protocol to create new assets, make bets and callback callable assets issued with Counterparty. Counterparty used proof of burn to issue XCP, instead of a more traditional fund-raising technique for alt-coin launches, to keep the initial distribution of funds as fair and decentralized as possible, and to avoid potential legal issues.

Wallets 
counterpartyd is the reference implementation of the Counterparty protocol, and Counterwallet is a deterministic web-wallet frontend to counterpartyd, in which all cryptography is handled client-side. Both are open source and hosted on GitHub. 

Freewallet (mobile and desktop) has become a more popular wallet with the Spells Of Genesis & Memorychain/Oasis Mining communities, while the Rare Pepe wallet targets Rare Pepe collectors specifically.

See also 

 Non-fungible token
 Rare Pepe

References

External links
 Official Website

Cryptocurrencies
Foreign exchange market
Payment systems
Digital currencies
Financial technology